Year 1395 (MCCCXCV) was a common year starting on Friday (link will display full calendar) of the Julian calendar, the 1395th year of the Common Era (CE) and Anno Domini (AD) designations, the 395th year of the 2nd millennium, the 95th year of the 14th century, and the 6th year of the 1390s decade.

Events 
 January–December 
 February 12 – The army led by Sigismund of Luxembourg is ambushed by Stephen I of Moldavia, on its way back after conquering Neamț Citadel, and the Hungarians must retreat empty handed.
 April 15 – Tokhtamysh–Timur war – Battle of the Terek River: Timur defeats Tokhtamysh of the Golden Horde at the Volga. The Golden Horde capital city, Sarai, is razed to the ground, and Timur installs a puppet ruler on the Golden Horde throne. Tokhtamysh escapes to Lithuania.
 May 1 – The Duchy of Milan is created, after Lord Gian Galeazzo Visconti of Milan buys the title of Duke from Wenceslaus, King of the Romans. 
 May 17
 Battle of Rovine: With the help of the Hungarians, Wallachia resists an invasion by the Ottomans and their Serb and Bulgarian vassals. But Mircea I of Wallachia has to temporarily flee to Transylvania, and Vlad I Uzurpatorul is placed on the throne by the Ottomans.
 Mary of Hungary dies, ending of the reign of Hungary by the Capet-Anjou family. Her co-reigning estranged husband, King Sigismund, becomes sole ruler of Hungary.
 June 3 – Sultan Bayezid I of the Ottoman Empire beheads Emperor Ivan Shishman of Ottoman-occupied eastern Bulgaria, after Shishman is accused of collaborating with the Wallachians during the 1394 Battle of Karanovasa.
 August 29 – Albert IV succeeds his father, Albert III, as Duke of Austria.
 September 8 – The death of King Stjepan Dabiša leads to the election of his wife Jelena Gruba as Queen of Bosnia. However, most of the Bosnian land is soon appropriated by King Sigismund of Hungary.

 Date unknown 
 Ramaracha succeeds Ramesuan as ruler of the Ayutthaya Kingdom in present-day southern Thailand.
 The Gwanghwamun Gate and the Jogyesa Temple are built in present-day Seoul.
 The Theotokos of Vladimir icon is moved to Moscow.
 John Rykener, also known as Johannes Richer and Eleanor, a transvestite prostitute working mainly in London (near Cheapside), but also active in Oxford, is arrested for cross-dressing and interrogated. The records have survived, the only surviving legal records from this age which mention same-sex intercourse.

Births 
 January 11 – Michele of Valois, French princess and Duchess Consort of Burgundy (d. 1422)
 March 18 – John Holland, 2nd Duke of Exeter, English military leader (d. 1447)
 September 7 – Reginald West, 6th Baron De La Warr, English politician (d. 1427)
 date unknown
 Fra Angelico, Italian painter (d. 1455)
 Niccolò Da Conti, Italian merchant and explorer (d. 1469)
 George of Trebizond, Greek philosopher and scholar (d. 1484)
 Jacques Cœur, French merchant (d. 1456)

Deaths 
 March 13 – John Barbour, Scottish poet
 May 17
 Prince Marko, Serbian leader
 Mary, Queen of Hungary, co-ruler
 June 3 – Ivan Shishman of Bulgaria, tsar (b. c.1350)
 August 29 – Duke Albert III of Austria (b. 1349)
 December 25 – Elisabeth, Countess of Neuchâtel, Swiss ruler
 date unknown
 Acamapichtli, 1st tlatoani (monarch) of Tenochtitlan (modern Mexico City), 1375-1395 (b. c. 1355)
 Margaret the Barefooted, Italian saint (b. 1325)

References